Octavius Oakley RWS (27 April 1800, in Bermondsey – 1 March 1867, in London), was a British watercolour portrait, figure and landscape artist.

Life

Oakley was born in Bermondsey, London on the 27th April 1800.

Initially he worked for a Leeds textile company. He developed into a specialist of portraits in watercolour and was given commissions by the Duke of Devonshire.

Whilst living in Derby where he painted rustic scenes until he moved to Leamington Spa in Warwickshire in 1836, but returned to London in the 1840s and worked there until his death, producing paintings of street scenes and gypsies and their lifestyle.

His emphasis on gypsy paintings which he exhibited at the Royal Watercolour Society earned him the name 'Gypsy Oakley'.

Oakley met Thomas Baker in Leamington Spa, where Baker was living and working and in 1841 did a portrait of the celebrated painter, who was an important figure in the Midlands and Birmingham art world. His youngest daughter, Isabel Naftel was also an artist.

He died at his home, 7 Chepstow Villas, Kensington, on the 1st March 1867 and was buried in a family grave (no.14459) on the western side of Highgate Cemetery.

Gallery

References

External links
Portraits by O. Oakley (National Portrait Gallery)
Portrait of Benjamin Gibbons Seated, with a view of Eton College Beyond  (Victorian web)

1800 births
1867 deaths
Burials at Highgate Cemetery
English watercolourists
19th-century English painters
English male painters
English landscape painters
19th-century English male artists